Caseyidae is a family of millipedes in the order Chordeumatida. Adult millipedes in this family have 30 segments (counting the collum as the first segment and the telson as the last). There are about 7 genera and at least 40 described species in Caseyidae.

Genera
 Caseya Cook & Collins, 1895
 Metopiona Gardner & Shelley, 1989
 Ochrogramma Gardner & Shelley, 1989
 Opiona Chamberlin, 1951
 Speoseya Causey, 1954
 Underwoodia Cook & Collins, 1895
 Vasingtona Chamberlin, 1941

References

Further reading

 
 
 
 

Chordeumatida
Millipede families